Rothwell is a town in the south-east of the City of Leeds metropolitan borough in West Yorkshire, England. It is situated between Leeds and Wakefield.

It is in the Rothwell ward of Leeds City Council and Elmet and Rothwell parliamentary constituency. Rothwell is part of the West Yorkshire Urban Area.

Rothwell had a population of 21,010 in the 2001 census, and the Rothwell ward has an estimated population of 32,365. At the 2011 census the ward had a population of 20,354. The town is close to the A1/M1 link road and the Stourton park and ride. The nearest railway station is Woodlesford.

History

Rothwell was mentioned in the Domesday Book as "Rodewelle".

One of the royal lodge's documented owners was John of Gaunt, 1st Duke of Lancaster, who is supposed to have killed the last wild boar in England while hunting nearby; hence a boar's head formed part of the arms of the former Rothwell Urban District Council. The parish church (Church Street) is dedicated to Holy Trinity and is on the site of an Anglo Saxon predecessor. The current church, which has a ring of eight bells, is of medieval origins but was substantially rebuilt in the 19th century: the tower retains medieval fabric believed to be from the 15th century.

John Blenkinsop (1783–1831) is buried at Holy Trinity Church. He was a pioneer in the use of steam locomotives on the nearby Middleton Railway.

The town was granted the rights of a market town in the 15th century and a twice-yearly fair. The tradition of a fair is maintained by the annual carnival which is organised by the Rothwell Entertainments Committee. May Day is celebrated beside the stone cross and on the Pastures on the first Monday Bank Holiday in May, while Rothwell Carnival is held in Springhead Park on the second Saturday of July every year.

An arch made of whale jawbones has marked the northern boundary by the junction with Wood Lane and the A61 road for over 100 years.

Rothwell is part of the historic Rhubarb Triangle, with the town and surrounding areas famed for having once produced 90% of the world's winter forced rhubarb from the forcing sheds that were common across the fields there.

20th century

St George's Hospital was situated off Wood Lane where now exists Castle Lodge Avenue and associated houses. It was built in 1903 to a design by Leeds architect Edward J. Dodgshun by the Rothwell, Methley and Hunslet Joint Isolation Hospital Committee which was formed under the Isolation Hospitals Act 1893 by an order of the West Riding County Council 10 January 1900. When first constructed it was known as the New Union Workhouse and Infirmary for the Hunslet Union, On being taken over by the Leeds Public Assistance Committee in 1934 it was renamed St George's Hospital. In 1934 it was transferred to the Leeds Health Committee. In 1948, the hospital was managed by the Leeds Group B Hospital Management Committee. After local government reorganisation in 1974 it was transferred to the Leeds Eastern District and soon after to the Leeds Western District. The hospital was closed in December 1991. From 1934 the hospital provided accommodation for the elderly ill, patients with chronic and acute mental illness, persons with learning disabilities, a maternity ward and a separate isolation ward. The site was developed for housing at the start of the 21st century but the original tall clock tower remains.

Rothwell Temperance Band is a Championship section brass band founded in Rothwell in 1984. Although they do not rehearse in Rothwell itself, they have strong connections with the town and hold many concerts for the local community. They actually rehearse in Wakefield. The closest Champion Section Brass Band is the Yorkshire Imperial Urquhart Travel Band, formerly of the Yorkshire Imperial Copperworks based in Stourton, from which the band is named. The Imps, as they are more commonly known, merged with the original Rothwell Band (founded 1881) in the 1990s.

Rothwell has a long history of coal mining. It was a site of early mining, using a system known as bell pits. Coal mining has been carried out in the area for over 600 years. There were many local pits including the Fanny, the Rose and Rothwell Water Haigh. As the reserves as Rothwell Haigh Colliery were exhausted, production ended on 9 December 1983, with the majority of the 650 men employed transferring to the new Selby Coalfield. Whereas some mineworkers moved house closer to Selby, many commuted daily from Rothwell to Selby for years. After closure, the old coking plant site at Haigh Colliery remained within the Coal Products Division of the NCB until privatisation in 1994, at which point former employees banded together to buy the site and later sold the site to a housing developer. In 1995, Leeds City Council and Leeds Groundwork formed a partnership which, together with local residents and community groups, transformed the former colliery site into a 124-acre country park with a sculpture trail, a pond trail, and a habitat for various forms of flora and fauna.

Rothwell was constituted an urban district in the West Riding of Yorkshire under the Local Government Act 1894. In 1937 it was expanded by taking in the Methley urban district and Hunslet Rural District.

It was incorporated into the City of Leeds metropolitan borough, West Yorkshire by the Local Government Act 1972. Its inclusion in the Leeds district as opposed to the Wakefield metropolitan district was controversial: originally planned for the Leeds district, it was added to the Wakefield district at the request of residents, but then moved to the Leeds district by the House of Lords.

21st century

The introduction of Leeds Valley Park in the early 21st century and its subsequent expansions have caused concerns for residents due to the parking problems caused on neighbouring Wood Lane. This is despite numerous efforts by local councillors, and the community, to include further parking restrictions.

Rothwell Urban District
Between 1894 and 1972, Rothwell was constituted as an urban district. This district included the areas of Rothwell, Methley, Oulton, Woodlesford, Stourton, Carlton, Robin Hood, Lofthouse and Thorpe. The Rothwell Urban District had a total population of around 25,000, but if it still existed today, that figure would be closer to 30,000. In 1972 these areas were taken into the newly formed City of Leeds Metropolitan District, although Thorpe, Lofthouse, Carlton and some parts of Robin Hood have a Wakefield postcode.

Town centre 
The town centre has high street chains, independent shops, restaurants and bars as well as a couple of pubs.

Since 2007, the town centre has experienced major redevelopments to respect the local area's conservation status, pedestrianising and restoring the original route of Commercial Street.

A new bus interchange funded by the West Yorkshire combined authority, is due to be constructed in 2022 within Marsh street car park with provision of driver restrooms and infrastructure for future electric buses.

Education
There are several primary schools in Rothwell including:
Holy Trinity Rothwell Primary School (Formerly Rothwell Church of England Primary School)
Rothwell Primary School
Rothwell Haigh Road Infant School
Rothwell Victoria Junior School
Rothwell St. Mary's Catholic primary School

There are two high schools in the Rothwell area:
Oulton Academy (Formerly Royds School and Royds Academy).
The Rodillian Academy – the former Rothwell Grammar School (actually in Lofthouse). Under the old 11 plus, it was the local grammar school for Rothwell and for villages south as far as Outwood.

Both Royds and Rodillian have sixth form colleges integrated in the school environment.

Other further education colleges in Rothwell:
Leeds City College – formerly Joseph Priestley College
WEC International was based at Springhead Park House offering Christian training in radio, and other media however has since moved.

Notable and former residents

Thomas Beckwith - F.A.S (1731–1786) English painter, genealogist and antiquary.
Mark Bell – musician of LFO fame, worked with Björk.
John Blenkinsop (1783–1831) – inventor of the rack railway system (buried in the grounds of Holy Trinity Church).
Martin Kelner – journalist, author, and radio presenter.
Michelle Hardwick – actress who portrayed Lizzie Hopkirk in The Royal and Vanessa Woodfield in Emmerdale
Lord Newby of Rothwell – Liberal Democrat & member of the House of Lords.
Paul Loughran – actor who portrayed Emmerdale character Butch Dingle.
Joseph Priestley – scientist.
The Pigeon Detectives – Indie rock band. 
Jane Tomlinson CBE – charity fundraiser, who raised over £1.5 million whilst suffering from terminal cancer.

Sport
David Batty - footballer, played for Leeds United and Blackburn Rovers, when they were English football champions
Jason Golden – Harlequins RL footballer.
Ryan Hall – Leeds Rhinos Rugby League footballer.
Carl Ablett – Leeds Rhinos Rugby league footballer.
Jack Hunt – professional footballer, currently playing for Sheffield Wednesday
Garry Schofield – Rugby League footballer & OBE.
Alan Smith – Ex Leeds United and England Football player 
Jamie Thackray – Hull F.C. Rugby League footballer.

Sports

Football
Rothwell is home to 3 football clubs:
Rothwell Town J.F.C – who are based at John O'Gaunts Recreation Ground near Rothwell Labour Club
Rothwell Juniors – Currently based at a purpose-built £1.5 million development at Fleet Lane, Woodlesford. Open age teams known as simply 'Rothwell FC'.
Rothwell Albion – A newly formed club in the area.

There are numerous teams in the wider Rothwell ward, these include; Carlton Athletic and Robin Hood Athletic, among others.

Golf
Oulton Hall golf course, which is currently owned by hotel group De Vere is located adjacent to Oulton Lane. The only 5-star golf resort in the North of England.

Bowls / Bowling
Bowls or bowling is also a popular sport, and there is a public bowling green in Springhead Park.

Tennis

There are four tennis courts located at Springhead Park. The courts are free to book and also offer paid for tennis coaching sessions too.

Squash & Racketball

Rothwell Squash & Racketball Club offers facilities for players of all standards from juniors and beginners up to first team Yorkshire League players.

Cricket

Rothwell Cricket Club field two teams in the Pontefract & District Cricket League, with the 1st XI competing in the top division in 2020.

Parkrun

Every Saturday morning a popular Parkrun is held around Springhead Park.

Notable places of interest
Oulton Hall & Golf Course
Holy Trinity Church, Rothwell
Rothwell Methodist Church (founded 1764)

Location grid

See also
Listed buildings in Rothwell, West Yorkshire

References

External links

LS26.org.uk - area website

 
Towns in West Yorkshire
Places in Leeds
Market towns in West Yorkshire
Unparished areas in West Yorkshire